Wita Lake is a lake in Blue Earth County, Minnesota, in the United States.

Wita Lake was named from a Sioux-language word meaning "Island Lake", for its two lake islands.

References

Lakes of Minnesota
Lakes of Blue Earth County, Minnesota